1806−20 (originally named the SGR 1806−20 cluster) is a heavily obscured star cluster on the far side of the Milky Way, approximately 28,000 light-years distant. Some sources claim as many as 50,000.  It contains the soft gamma repeater SGR 1806−20 and the luminous blue variable hypergiant LBV 1806−20, a candidate for the most luminous star in the Milky Way. LBV 1806−20 and many of the other massive stars in the cluster are thought likely to end as supernovas in a few million years, leaving only neutron stars or black holes as remnants.

The cluster is heavily obscured by intervening dust, and mostly visible in the infrared. It is part of the larger W31 H II region and giant molecular cloud. It has a compact core of ~0.2 pc in diameter with a more extended halo of ~2 pc in diameter containing the LBV and at least three Wolf–Rayet stars (of types WC8, WN6, and WN7) and an OB supergiant, plus other young massive stars.

See also 
 Wolf–Rayet star
 LBV 1806−20
 SGR 1806−20
 Hypergiant
 Star cluster
 Luminous blue variable
 Charles Wolf
 Georges Rayet

References

External links 
 The Unusual High-Mass Star Cluster 1806−20 

Sagittarius (constellation)
Open clusters